Margo Haddad is a director, actress and writer from Jordan, she received a Bachelor of Fine Arts (Drama) from Yarmouk University and an MA in Mass media - Women's Studies from University of Jordan, she continued her studies in Egypt, in which she got her PhD in Academy of Arts in Art Criticism - Film Criticism, and received an honorary doctorate, from Cambridge international college.

Creativity in the top of the issuance of her first book of its kind in the Arab world, holds the title of "The image of women and men in the video clip".

She participated in several Arab and local soap operas with many prominent directors like Hatem Ali, Mohammad Aziziyeh, Basil Al-Khatib and Chawki El Mejri.

Career

Films & Series 
 2017 (House Of Setnakht) Bet Set - Directed by Ahmad Aqel
 2017 Series Orchidia - Directed by Hatem Ali
 2017 Series AlSultan Walshah - Directed by Mohammad Azizieh
 2017 Series Shawq - Directed by Mohamed Lotfi
 2015 The series of the Malek Ibn alRayb - directed by Mohammed Lotfi 
 2015 Epidemic - directed by Mohamed Ibrahimi
 2014 Brothers Blood series - directed by Hassan Abu Shaireh
 2013 Nafethat Al-Salam Movie - Directed by Ahmad Najem
 2013 Series Toum Al Ghura
 2011 Series dafater altofan Directed by mofaq al salah
 2011 Series Awdat Al Amal - Directed by Mohammad Lutfi 
 2011 Al Ayadi Al bayda Movie - Directed by Mohammad Alwan
 2010 Series Al Anud - Directed by Ahmad Duibes
 2010 Series Balqees - Directed by Basel Alkhateeb
 2008 Series Bent Alnur - Directed by Samer Barqawi
 2008 series wadha wabn Ajlan Directed by Azmi Mustafa
 2008 Series Sadun Alawaji - Directed by Natheer Awwad
 2006 Series Altareek Alwaer Directed by Shawki Mejri
 2006 Series Hek o mesh hek - Directed by Iyad Alkhanzur
 2005 Series [Altareek ela Kabul] - Directed by Mohammad Aziziyeh
 2005 Series Shehrazad - Directed by Shawqi Almajeri
 2005 Series Shu Hal hake - Directed by Naji Taama
 2003 Aljawareh Movie - Directed by Mohammad Alawale
 2003 Series Ahlam Marzuq - Directed by Ahmad Duebes
 2003 Series Durub Alhena' - Directed by Shalan Aldabas
 2001 Series Abu Yousef (Ep. 2) - Directed by Nabeel Alshomali
 2000 Series Abu Yousef (Ep. 1) - Directed by Nabeel Alshomali
 2000 Series Ayam Aseeba - Directed by Mohammad Yousef Alabadi
 2000 Series Ta'er Alshawq - Directed by Orwa Zrieqat
 1999 Series Dumuu' AlQamar - Directed by Salem Alqurdi
 1999 Series Khoyut fe Althalam - Directed by Khaled AlKhazur
 1998 Series Rajul ala Alhamesh - Directed by Mohammad Haneya
 1997 Al Haya Awalan Film - Directed by Faysal Alzobi

References 

Living people
1988 births
Jordanian actresses